Gregory Carlton Anthony (born November 15, 1967) is an American former professional basketball player who is a television analyst for NBA TV and Turner Sports.  He played 11 seasons in the National Basketball Association (NBA). Anthony also contributes to Yahoo! Sports as a college basketball analyst and serves as a co-host/analyst on SiriusXM NBA Radio. His son, Cole Anthony, plays for the Orlando Magic.

Early life
Born and raised in Las Vegas, Nevada, Anthony aspired to enter politics. He wanted to become Nevada's first black Senator. A graduate of Rancho High School in North Las Vegas, Nevada, Anthony played his freshman year of college basketball for the University of Portland where he was the WCC Freshman of the Year before transferring to the University of Nevada, Las Vegas. In his junior season with UNLV, the Runnin' Rebels won the 1990 NCAA Championship game over Duke with Anthony starting at point guard, as UNLV blew out the Blue Devils and Christian Laettner by 30 points. He played almost the entire season with a broken jaw. He was a three-time All Big West performer and 3rd Team All America his senior season. This talented team was coached by Jerry Tarkanian and also included future NBA players Stacey Augmon and Larry Johnson.  In March 2011, HBO premiered a documentary entitled Runnin' Rebels of UNLV.

During summer breaks, Anthony worked at the World Economic Summit and on Capitol Hill as an intern to for Rep. Barbara Vucanovich.  He also started a T-shirt and silkscreening business, Two-Hype, while attending UNLV.  His entrepreneurial endeavor was the reason why he relinquished his athletic scholarship.  Anthony made enough money selling T-shirts that he was able to pay for his own tuition.

NBA career
Anthony was drafted by the New York Knicks in the first round of the 1991 NBA Draft, with the reputation of being a poor outside shooter but an excellent defender. He served as a point guard and defensive specialist, and typified the hard-nosed defensive reputation of Pat Riley's Knicks. On May 24, 1994, Anthony scored 16 points off the bench during a 100-89 Eastern Conference Finals Game 1 win over the Indiana Pacers. The Knicks would ultimately beat the Pacers to advance to the 1994 NBA Finals, but lose to the Houston Rockets in a hard-fought seven game series.

In 1995, Anthony was drafted in the expansion draft as the 1st pick (2nd overall) by the Vancouver Grizzlies, where he would be the full-time starter at point guard for two seasons. On January 5, 1996, Anthony scored a career-high 32 points during a 103-102 overtime win against the 76ers. After experiencing a journeyman end to his career, in which he played mostly off the bench for Seattle, Portland, Chicago and Milwaukee, he retired in 2002.

Broadcasting career 
Upon retirement, Anthony joined ESPN as an analyst for both NBA coverage on ESPN and ABC.

On December 13, 2008, Anthony made his debut as a college basketball analyst for CBS Sports, replacing Clark Kellogg, who was promoted to lead commentator.

Anthony agreed to be a color commentator for the YES Network covering the Brooklyn Nets for the 2012–2013 season alongside Ian Eagle, Mike Fratello, and Jim Spanarkel.

In 2014, Anthony and Kellogg swapped their respective roles at CBS Sports, with Anthony moving to the broadcast booth as a lead commentator and Kellogg returning to his previous role as a studio analyst.

Anthony has been featured as a commentator in the NBA 2K series of video games since NBA 2K16.

Off court

Personal life
Anthony is married to Chere Lucas Anthony, a dermatologist, with whom he has one daughter and one son. He has two other children from a previous marriage to Crystal McCrary, Cole and Ella Anthony. Cole was the starting point guard for the University of North Carolina Tar Heels and was drafted by Orlando Magic in the NBA 2020 draft with the 15th pick in the first round.

Politics
Anthony has been politically active with the Republican Party since his days at UNLV, where he graduated with a degree in political science and served as the vice chairman of Nevada's Young Republicans.

In 2012, Anthony publicly endorsed Republican presidential candidate Mitt Romney, appearing in a Romney ad in Nevada.

Arrest
On January 16, 2015, Anthony was arrested in Washington, D.C. and charged with soliciting a prostitute. Following his arrest, Anthony was indefinitely suspended by CBS and Turner Sports.  On February 11, Anthony reached a deferred prosecution agreement in which the charge would be dropped provided he completed 32 hours of community service and stayed out of trouble for four months.

In March 2016, Anthony was dropped by CBS, but returned to Turner as a studio analyst for NBATV, and as a fill-in analyst for the NBA on TNT during the regular season and the playoffs.

NBA career statistics
A list of Anthony's career statistics:

Regular season

|-
|-
| style="text-align:left;"| 
| style="text-align:left;"| New York
| 82 || 1 || 18.4 || .370 || .145 || .741 || 1.7 ||3.8 || 0.7 || .1 || 5.5
|-
| style="text-align:left;"| 
| style="text-align:left;"| New York
| 70 || 35 || 24.3 || .415 || .133 || .673 || 2.4 || 5.7 || 1.6 || .2 || 6.6
|-
| style="text-align:left;"| 
| style="text-align:left;"| New York
| 80 || 36 || 24.9 || .394 || .300 || .774 || 2.4 || 4.6 || 1.4 || .2 || 7.9
|-
| style="text-align:left;"| 
| style="text-align:left;"| New York
| 61 || 2 || 15.5 || .437 || .361 || .789 || 1.0 || 2.6 || 0.8 || .1 || 6.1
|-
| style="text-align:left;"| 
| style="text-align:left;"| Vancouver
| 69 || 68 || 30.4 || .415 || .332 || .771 || 2.5 || 6.9 || 1.7 || .2 || 14.0
|-
| style="text-align:left;"| 
| style="text-align:left;"| Vancouver
| 65 || 44 || 28.7 || .393 || .370 || .730 || 2.8 || 6.3 || 2.0 || .1 || 9.5
|-
| style="text-align:left;"| 
| style="text-align:left;"| Seattle
| 80 || 0 || 12.8 || .430 || .415 || .663 || 1.4 || 2.6 || 0.8 || .0 || 5.2
|-
| style="text-align:left;"| 
| style="text-align:left;"| Portland
| 50 || 0 || 16.1 || .414 || .392 || .697 || 1.3 || 2.0 || 1.3 || .1 || 6.4
|-
| style="text-align:left;"| 
| style="text-align:left;"| Portland
| 82 || 3 || 18.9 || .406 || .378 || .772 || 1.6 || 2.5 || 0.7 || .1 || 6.3
|-
| style="text-align:left;"| 
| style="text-align:left;"| Portland
| 58 || 0 || 14.8 || .383 || .409 || .657 || 1.1 || 1.4 || 0.7 || .1 || 4.9
|-
| style="text-align:left;"| 
| style="text-align:left;"| Chicago
| 36 || 35 || 26.7 || .394 || .322 || .671 || 2.4 || 5.6 || 1.4 || .1 || 8.4
|-
| style="text-align:left;"| 
| style="text-align:left;"| Milwaukee
| 24 || 3 || 23.0 || .372 || .260 || .619 || 1.8 || 3.3 || 1.2 || .0 || 7.2
|-
| style="text-align:center;" colspan="2" | Career
| 757 || 227 || 20.9 || .403 || .349 || .733 || 1.9 || 4.0 || 1.2 || .1 || 7.3

Playoffs

|-
|-
| style="text-align:left;"| 1992
| style="text-align:left;"| New York
| 12 || 0 || 17.8 || .413 || .417 || .606 || 1.4 || 3.4 || 1.3 || .1 || 5.3
|-
| style="text-align:left;"| 1993
| style="text-align:left;"| New York
| 15 || 0 || 16.0 || .400 || .214 || .571 || 2.0 || 3.5 || 0.9 || .1 || 3.9
|-
| style="text-align:left;"| 1994
| style="text-align:left;"| New York
| 25 || 3 || 17.4 || .352 || .295 || .583 || 1.1 || 2.4 || 0.8 || .3 || 4.9
|-
| style="text-align:left;"| 1995
| style="text-align:left;"| New York
| 11 || 0 || 12.3 || .395 || .304 || .909 || 0.9 || 1.4 || 0.2 || .2 || 4.3
|-
| style="text-align:left;"| 1998
| style="text-align:left;"| Seattle
| 9 || 0 || 13.1 || .300 || .263 || .375 || 1.1 || 1.1 || 0.6 || .1 || 3.6
|-
| style="text-align:left;"| 1999
| style="text-align:left;"| Portland
| 13 || 0 || 17.3 || .327 || .258 || .676 || 1.1 || 2.5 || 1.0 || .1 || 5.2
|-
| style="text-align:left;"| 2000
| style="text-align:left;"| Portland
| 15 || 0 || 14.2 || .365 || .323 || .750 || 1.1 || 1.7 || 0.9 || .3 || 4.0
|-
| style="text-align:left;"| 2001
| style="text-align:left;"| Portland
| 2 || 0 || 8.5 || .333 || .333 || .000 || 0.0 || 0.0 || 0.5 || .0 || 2.5
|-
| style="text-align:center;" colspan="2" | Career
| 102 || 3 || 15.7 || .362 || .294 || .643 || 1.2 || 2.3 || 0.8 || .2 || 4.5

See also

 List of NCAA Division I men's basketball career assists leaders
 List of NCAA Division I men's basketball career steals leaders
 Black conservatism in the United States

References

External links

ESPN.com: Greg Anthony archive
PRO BASKETBALL; Suns' Biggest Beef Is Over Anthony's 'Sucker Punch'

1967 births
Living people
African-American basketball players
American expatriate basketball people in Canada
American men's basketball players
Basketball players from Nevada
Chicago Bulls players
College basketball announcers in the United States
Milwaukee Bucks players
National Basketball Association broadcasters
Nevada Republicans
New York Knicks draft picks
New York Knicks players
Point guards
Portland Pilots men's basketball players
Portland Trail Blazers players
Seattle SuperSonics players
Sportspeople from Las Vegas
UNLV Runnin' Rebels basketball players
Vancouver Grizzlies expansion draft picks
Vancouver Grizzlies players
21st-century African-American people
20th-century African-American sportspeople